Nastic movements occur in plants.

Nastic may also refer to:
 Nàstic, Spanish sports club
 Nastić, the surname of:
 Bojan Nastić (born 1994), Bosnian footballer
 Nenad Nastić (born 1981), Serbian footballer
 Radovan Nastić (born 1975), American multimedia sub cultural artist 
 Stefan Nastić (born 1992), Serbian professional basketball player
 Varnava Nastić (1914–1964), Serbian–American bishop
 Żaklin Nastić (born 1980), German politician (The Left)

See also 
 Nastik (disambiguation)